Mount Pleasant Historic District (also known as Old Village Historic District) is a national historic district located at Mount Pleasant, Charleston County, South Carolina. The district encompasses nine contributing buildings in the town of Mount Pleasant.  The dwellings reflect Mount Pleasant's historic role as a summer resort town.  The building reflect  architectural styles of the 18th, 19th and early 20th centuries, including vernacular Georgian, Greek Revival and Gothic Revival.  Notable buildings include the Mount Pleasant Presbyterian Church, St. Andrew's Episcopal Church, Mount Pleasant Seventh-Day Adventist Church, Hibben-McIver House, 200 Bank Street, and the Captain Peter Lewis House.  Located in the district is the separately listed Old Courthouse.

It was listed on the National Register of Historic Places in 1973.

References

Historic districts on the National Register of Historic Places in South Carolina
Georgian architecture in South Carolina
Greek Revival architecture in South Carolina
Gothic Revival architecture in South Carolina
Buildings and structures in Charleston County, South Carolina
National Register of Historic Places in Charleston County, South Carolina
Mount Pleasant, South Carolina